A Shakespeare festival is a theatre organization that stages the works of William Shakespeare continually.

Origins
In 1830, the Mulberry Club (a scholarly group formed in Stratford-upon-Avon, named after the destroyed New Place mulberry tree) began organising annual festivities on Shakespeare's birthday, which they referred to as the "Shakespeare Festival". These continued until at least 1836. From 1886 to 1919, Frank Benson directed 28 spring and six summer "Shakespeare festivals" at the original Shakespeare Memorial Theatre in Stratford.

In 1935 the Oregon Shakespeare Festival, or OSF, was founded in Ashland, Oregon, USA. Originally named the "Oregon Shakespearean Festival"; the name was changed in 1988. Angus L. Bowmer, founder of OSF, wrote in 1954 that Shakespeare Festivals have in common the following attributes: 1) established firmly in one place; 2) repertoire (staging a variety of Shakespeare plays) and 3) a physical stage similar to that used in Shakespeare's lifetime. According to Bowmer, the inspiration for Elizabethan staging of contemporary Shakespeare productions came from William Poel, an English director who organized the Elizabethan Stage Society in London in the early 20th century. His concepts of Elizabethan staging were brought to North America by Ben Iden Payne.

Other early Shakespeare festivals in North America staged on replicas of the Globe Theatre include the Old Globe Theatre in San Diego (1937) and the Hofstra Shakespeare Festival, launched at Hofstra University in 1950. The American Shakespeare Theatre operated on a festival stage in Stratford, Connecticut, United States from 1955 to the 1980s.

Arthur Lithgow, father of actor John Lithgow, founded the "Antioch Shakespeare Festival" (also known as Shakespeare Under the Stars") at Antioch College in Yellow Springs, Ohio in 1952. In its five years of existence, the Festival performed the entire Shakespeare canon. In 1953, the Stratford Shakespeare Festival was founded in the Canadian city of Stratford, Ontario, with Tyrone Guthrie as the festival's first Artistic Director. The New York Shakespeare Festival in New York City (now known as The Public Theater) has produced Free Shakespeare shows since 1955.

Festivals

Canada
 Bard on the Beach — Vancouver, British Columbia
 Freewill Shakespeare Festival — Edmonton, Alberta
 Repercussion Theatre — Montreal, Quebec
 Shakespeare by the Sea — Halifax, Nova Scotia
 Shakespeare by the Sea — St. John's, Newfoundland and Labrador
 Shakespeare in the Ruff — Toronto, Ontario
 Shakespeare in the Ruins — Winnipeg, Manitoba
 Shakespeare on the Saskatchewan — Saskatoon, Saskatchewan
 Stratford Shakespeare Festival — Stratford, Ontario

Europe
 Bremer Shakespeare Company — Bremen, Germany
 Craiova International Shakespeare Festival — Craiova, Romania
 Dublin Shakespeare Society — Dublin, Ireland
 Gdańsk Shakespeare Festival — Gdańsk, Poland
 Prague Shakespeare Festival — Prague, Czech Republic

United Kingdom
 Bard in the Botanics — Glasgow, Scotland
 Cheek by Jowl — London, England
 Creation Theatre Company — Oxford, England
 Dolphin's Back — London, England
 Druid Shakespeare — Galway, Ireland
 Edward's Boys — Stratford-upon-Avon, England
 National Theatre — London, England
 Original Shakespeare Company — London, England
 Oxford Shakespeare Festival — Oxford, England
 Rose Playhouse Bankside — London, England
 Rose Theatre Kingston — Kingston upon Thames, England
 Royal Exchange — Manchester, England
 Royal Shakespeare Company — London, England
 shakespeare.scot — Dundee, Scotland
 Shakespeare's Globe — Stratford-upon-Avon, England
 Sirrah Sisters — London, England
 Smooth Faced Gentlemen — London, England
 York Shakespeare Project — York, England

United States
 Actors' Shakespeare Project — Boston, Massachusetts
 African-American Shakespeare Company — San Francisco, California
 Alabama Shakespeare Festival — Montgomery, Alabama
 American Players Theatre — Spring Green, Wisconsin
 American Shakespeare Center — Staunton, Virginia
 Annapolis Shakespeare Company — Annapolis, Maryland
 Antioch Shakespeare Festival — Yellow Springs, Ohio
 Archive Theatre — Austin, Texas
 Arkansas Shakespeare Theatre — Conway, Arkansas
 Atlanta Shakespeare Company — Atlanta, Georgia
 Austin Shakespeare — Austin, Texas
 Bag & Baggage Productions — Hillsboro, Oregon
 Baltimore Shakespeare Factory — Baltimore, Maryland
 Band of Brothers Shakespeare Company — Johnstown, Pennsylvania
 Barefoot Shakespeare Company — New York City, New York
 Bath Shakespeare Festival — Bath, Maine
 Bay Colony Shakespeare Company — Marshfield, Massachusetts
 Brave Spirits Theatre — McLean, Virginia
 California Shakespeare Theater — Orinda, California
 Camden Shakespeare Festival — Camden, Maine
 Chesapeake Shakespeare Company — Baltimore, Maryland
 Chicago Shakespeare Theater — Chicago, Illinois
 Cincinnati Shakespeare Company — Cincinnati, Ohio
 Classical Actors Ensemble — Minneapolis–Saint Paul, Minnesota
 Colonial Theater Shakespeare Festival — Westerly, Rhode Island
 Colorado Shakespeare Festival — Boulder, Colorado
 Connecticut Free Shakespeare — Norwalk, Connecticut
 Commonwealth Shakespeare Company — Boston, Massachusetts
 Coos Bay Shakespeare in the Park — Coos Bay, Oregon
 Cromulent Shakespeare Company — Minneapolis–Saint Paul, Minnesota
 Delaware Shakespeare — Wilmington, Delaware
 Door Shakespeare — Sister Bay, Wisconsin
 Fairbanks Shakespeare Theatre — Fairbanks, Alaska
 Fern Shakespeare Company — Atlanta, Georgia
 First Folio Shakespeare Festival — Oak Brook, Illinois
 Flagstaff Shakespeare Festival — Flagstaff, Arizona
 Flatwater Shakespeare Company — Lincoln, Nebraska
 Flint Hills Shakespeare Festival — St. Marys, Kansas
 Florida Shakespeare Theatre — Miami, Florida
 Folger Shakespeare Theatre — Washington, D.C.
 Foothills Theatre Company — Littleton, Colorado
 Garfield Shakespeare Company — Indianapolis, Indiana
 Georgia Shakespeare Festival — Atlanta, Georgia
 Grand Valley Shakespeare Festival — Allendale, Michigan
 Great River Shakespeare Festival — Winona, Minnesota
 GreenStage — Seattle, Washington
 Hampshire Shakespeare Company — Amherst, Massachusetts
 Hamptons Shakespeare Festival — Long Island, New York
 Harlem Shakespeare Festival — Harlem, New York
 Harrisburg Shakespeare Festival — Harrisburg, Pennsylvania
 Hawai'i Shakespeare Festival — Honolulu, Hawai'i
 Heart of America Shakespeare Festival — Kansas City, Missouri
 Hip to Hip Theatre Company — New York City, New York
 Hofstra Shakespeare Festival — Hempstead, New York
 Hoosier Shakespeare Festival — Marion, Indiana
 Houston Shakespeare Festival — Houston, Texas
 Hudson Shakespeare Company — Stratford, Connecticut
 Hudson Valley Shakespeare Festival — Garrison, New York
 Hudson Warehouse — New York City, New York
 Idaho Shakespeare Festival — Boise, Idaho
 Illinois Shakespeare Festival — Bloomington, Illinois
 Iowa Shakespeare Experience — Des Moines, Iowa
 Kentucky Shakespeare Festival — Louisville, Kentucky
 Lantern Theatre Company — Philadelphia, Pennsylvania
 Lake Tahoe Shakespeare Festival — Lake Tahoe, California
 Lakeside Shakespeare — Benzie County, Michigan
 Lord Denney's Players — Columbus, Ohio
 Madison Shakespeare Company — Waunakee, Wisconsin
 Marin Shakespeare Company — San Rafael, California
 Michigan Shakespeare Festival — Jackson, Michigan
 Missouri Shakespeare Festival — Joplin, Missouri
 Montana Shakespeare in the Parks — Bozeman, Montana
 Montford Park Players — Asheville, North Carolina
 Muse of Fire Theatre Company — Evanston, Illinois
 Nashville Shakespeare Festival — Jackson, Michigan
 Nebraska Shakespeare Festival — Omaha, Nebraska
 New Orleans Shakespeare Festival — New Orleans, Louisiana
 New Swan Shakespeare Festival — Irvine, California
 New York Shakespeare Festival — New York City, New York
 North Carolina Shakespeare Festival — Winston-Salem, North Carolina
 North Dakota Shakespeare Festival — Grand Forks, North Dakota
 Notre Dame Shakespeare Festival — South Bend, Indiana
 Ohio Shakespeare Theatre — Akron, Ohio
 Old Globe Theatre — San Diego, California
 Oregon Shakespeare Festival — Ashland, Oregon
 Original Practice Shakespeare Festival — Portland, Oregon
 Orlando Shakes — Orlando, California
 Pennsylvania Shakespeare Festival — Center Valley, Pennsylvania
 Philadelphia Shakespeare Theatre — Philadelphia, Pennsylvania
 Pigeon Creek Shakespeare Company — Grand Haven, Michigan
 Pittsburgh Shakespeare in the Park — Pittsburgh, Pennsylvania
 Portland Actors Ensemble — Portland, Oregon
 Red Bull Theatre — New York City, New York
 Resurgens Theatre Company — Atlanta, Georgia
 Richmond Shakespeare Festival — Richmond, Virginia
 Riverside Shakespeare Company — New York City, New York
 Robinson Shakespeare Company — South Bend, Indiana
 Rochester Community Players — Rochester, New York
 Rome Shakespeare Festival — Rome, Georgia
 San Francisco Shakespeare Festival — San Francisco, California
 Saint Louis Shakespeare Festival — St. Louis, Missouri
 Santa Clarita Shakespeare — Santa Clarita, California
 Santa Cruz Shakespeare — Santa Cruz, California
 Seattle Shakespeare Festival — Seattle, Washington
 Seven Stages Shakespeare Company — Portsmouth, New Hampshire
 Shakespeare & Company (Minnesota) — White Bear Lake, Minnesota
 Shakespeare & Company (Massachusetts) — Lenox, Massachusetts
 Shakespeare by the Sea — San Pedro, California
 Shakespeare Carolina — Rock Hill, South Carolina
 Shakespeare Festival of Dallas — Dallas, Texas
 Shakespeare in Delaware Park — Buffalo, New York
 Shakespeare in Detroit — Detroit, Michigan
 Shakespeare in Yosemite — Merced, California
 Shakespeare Now! Theatre Company — Brookline, Massachusetts
 Shakespeare Theatre of New Jersey — Madison, New Jersey
 Shakespeare Theatre Company — Washington, D.C.
 Silicon Valley Shakespeare — Washington, D.C.
 South Carolina Shakespeare Company — Columbia, South Carolina
 South Dakota Shakespeare Festival — Vermillion, South Dakota
 Southern Shakespeare Festival — Tallahassee, Florida
 Southwest Shakespeare Company — Mesa, Arizona
 Sweet Tea Shakespeare — Fayetteville, North Carolina
 Syracuse Shakespeare in the Park — Syracuse, New York
 Taffety Punk Theatre Company — Washington, D.C.
 Tennessee Shakespeare Company — Fayetteville, North Carolina
 Texas Shakespeare Festival — Kilgore, Texas
 Theatre at Monmouth — Monmouth, Maine
 Theatre for a New Audience — New York City, New York
 Troupe of Friends — Westfield, New Jersey
 Upstate Shakespeare Festival — Greenville, South Carolina
 Utah Shakespeare Festival — Cedar City, Utah
 Vermont Shakespeare Festival — Greensboro, Vermont
 Virginia Shakespeare Festival — Williamsburg, Virginia
 Washington Shakespeare Festival — Mount Vernon, Washington
 West Virginia Shakespeare Festival — Huntington, West Virginia
 What You Will Shakespeare Company — Urbana, Illinois
 Wichita Shakespeare Company — Wichita, Kansas
 Will Geer Theatricum Botanicum — Topanga, California
 Wyoming Shakespeare Festival Company — Lander, Wyoming
 Young Shakespeare Players — Madison, Wisconsin

Staged reading series
 Alabama Shakespeare Project — Tuscaloosa, Alabama
 Appalachian Shakespeare Project — Athens, West Virginia
 Back Room Shakespeare Project — Chicago, Illinois
 Black Shakespeare Project — Brooklyn, New York
 Manhattan Shakespeare Project — Manhattan, New York
 Play On! Shakespeare Project — Portland, Oregon
 Portland Shakespeare Project — Portland, Oregon
 Shakespeare Project of Chicago — Chicago, Illinois
 The Shakespeare Project — New York City, New York

Fictional
 New Burbage Shakespeare Festival — New Burbage, Canada (Slings & Arrows)

See also
 Shakespeare Theatre Association
 Shakespeare in the Park festivals
 European Shakespeare Festivals Network (ESFN)
 List of festivals in Glasgow
 List of festivals in the United States
 Repertory theatre
 Shakespeare Club of Stratford-upon-Avon

References

Lists of theatre festivals